is a J-pop singer from Okinawa, Japan, and an original member of the group Super Monkey's.  She left at the end of 1993, and later worked as a dance instructor at the Okinawa Actors School.

References

See also 
 Super Monkey's

1977 births
Living people
People from Okinawa Prefecture
Japanese pop musicians
Musicians from Okinawa Prefecture
21st-century Japanese singers
21st-century Japanese women singers